WNRI (1380 AM, "1380 AM & 99.9 FM WNRI") is a radio station located in Woonsocket, Rhode Island. The station has a news/talk radio format and has been owned by Bouchard Broadcasting Inc. since 2004.  WNRI began broadcasting November 28, 1954.

Programming
WNRI airs a news/talk format with locally produced programs daily. The station is also affiliated with several national networks, including GCN, Radio America, and SRN.

Translator

An earlier WNRI
In the 1930s and 1940s, the WNRI call letters were assigned to an NBC owned-and-operated shortwave station (originally W3XL) that transmitted from Bound Brook, New Jersey, a site it shared with NBC Blue-era WJZ. Originally, programming was a combination of network simulcasts and specially produced news and information programs in Spanish and Portuguese for Latin America.

On November 1, 1942, the United States government assumed control of all privately owned American shortwave stations for the war effort.  During this period, WNRI aired programming produced by government agencies, including the early Voice of America.

While NBC retained the right to resume private control of the station after the war, they did not exercise that option, continuing to lease the facilities to the State Department for VOA broadcasts.

As of January 1, 1947, its frequencies were:

49m: 6.1Mc.
31m: 9.67Mc.
25m: 11.89Mc.
19m: 15.15 & 15.19Mc.
15m: 21.63Mc.

External links
 

 
 
 
 International Broadcasting Stations of the United States: link to NBC's WNRI

NRI
News and talk radio stations in the United States
Radio stations established in 1954
Woonsocket, Rhode Island